Jake Richard Rooney (born 22 August 2003) is an English professional footballer who plays as a defender for Derby County.

Career
Rooney joined the Burnley academy at age 14, after leaving Tranmere Rovers following the closure of their academy. He joined Derby County on 8 August 2022, following a trial period with the club, and made his debut for Derby County the following day, playing 63 minutes of Derby's 2-1 EFL Cup first round win at Mansfield Town.

Career statistics

Personal life
Rooney is a cousin of former England & Manchester United striker and former Derby County and D.C. United manager Wayne Rooney and Oldham midfielder John Rooney.

References

2003 births
Living people
English footballers
Tranmere Rovers F.C. players
Burnley F.C. players
Derby County F.C. players
Association football defenders
Rooney family (England)